Omar Almeida Quintana (born Oct 28, 1981) is a Cuban chess Grandmaster. Almeida Quintana became a Grandmaster in 2006 and his current FIDE rating is 2523. His highest achieved FIDE rating in the database is 2593. He is the 6th best chess player in Cuba as of May 2020. 

In 2010 he tied for 1st with Azer Mirzoev at the XVIII Torneo Internacional in Albacete.

References

External links 
 

1981 births
Chess grandmasters
Living people
Cuban chess players